The 2016 AFL season was the 91st season in the Australian Football League (AFL) contested by the North Melbourne Football Club.

Squad for 2016
Statistics are correct as of end of 2015 season.
Flags represent the state of origin, i.e. the state in which the player played his Under-18s football.

For players: (c) denotes captain, (vc) denotes vice-captain, (lg) denotes leadership group.
For coaches: (s) denotes senior coach, (cs) denotes caretaker senior coach, (a) denotes assistant coach, (d) denotes development coach.

Playing list changes

The following summarises all player changes between the conclusion of the 2015 season and the beginning of the 2016 season.

In

Out

List management

Season summary

Pre-season matches

Home and away season

Finals matches

Ladder

Individual awards and records

Milestones

Debuts

1Had previously played for another club but played their first match for the North Melbourne.

AFL Rising Star

References

North Melbourne